The striped woodcreeper (Xiphorhynchus obsoletus) is a species of bird in the woodcreeper subfamily (Dendrocolaptinae). It is found in Bolivia, Brazil, Colombia, Ecuador, French Guiana, Guyana, Peru, Suriname, and Venezuela. Its natural habitats are subtropical or tropical moist lowland forests, subtropical or tropical swamps, and subtropical or tropical dry shrubland.

References

striped woodcreeper
Birds of the Amazon Basin
Birds of the Guianas
striped woodcreeper
Birds of Brazil
Taxonomy articles created by Polbot